"Come On and Do It" is a song by Swedish singer Pandora, released in December 1993 as the second single from her debut studio album, One of a Kind (1993). It features an uncredited rap by K-Slim, and peaked at number four in Finland and number five in Sweden. On the Eurochart Hot 100, it reached number 51. Outside Europe, the single was a hit in Israel, peaking at number eight. In Australia, it reached number 166. A music video was also produced to promote the single.

Track listing
 CD single
"Come On and Do It" (Radio Edit) – 3:18
"Come On and Do It" (The Funky Ride Version II) – 4:14

 CD maxi
"Come On and Do It" (Radio Edit) – 3:18
"Come On and Do It" (The Funky Ride Version II) – 4:14
"Get Your Chance" – 3:45

Charts

Weekly charts

Year-end charts

References

 

1993 singles
1993 songs
English-language Swedish songs
Virgin Records singles
Pandora (singer) songs